Wilbur Snapp (August 5, 1920 – September 6, 2003) was a self-taught American musician who was the stadium organist for the Clearwater Phillies, a minor-league baseball team, and for the Philadelphia Phillies in spring training, over a period of 20 years.

Snapp served in the Army Air Forces in World War II; he married his wife Janice in 1942. Despite being unable to read sheet music, Snapp taught himself to play the organ at age 35; upon his retirement from operating a music store in Ohio, he moved to Florida and became a ballpark organist for the Clearwater Phillies.

On June 26, 1985 he was ejected from a game at the Jack Russell Stadium for playing "Three Blind Mice" in response to what he thought was a bad call from the umpire, Kevin O'Connor. The umpire pointed up to Snapp, who was sitting at his organ behind first base, then thumbed him out of the game.

References

External links
National Public Radio interview with Snapp's widow Janice Snapp, September 9, 2003

1920 births
2003 deaths
20th-century American male musicians
20th-century American musicians
20th-century organists
American male organists
American organists
Musicians from Springfield, Ohio
People from Champaign County, Ohio
People from South Pasadena, Florida
Stadium organists
United States Army Air Forces personnel of World War II
American people of German descent